The iHeartRadio Music Award for Best Female Artist was first presented in 2016.

Winners and nominees

Artists with multiple wins and nominations
Most wins
 Taylor Swift – 2

Most nominations
 Taylor Swift and Ariana Grande – 5
 Halsey and Dua Lipa – 3
 Adele, Billie Eilish, Selena Gomez and Rihanna – 2

See also

 List of music awards honoring women

References

iHeartRadio Music Awards
Music awards honoring women
Awards established in 2016